Eric Conrad Peters (10 August 1903 – 28 December 1985) was a British tennis player.

An Oxford graduate, Peters played a patient, defencive brand of tennis and was active in the late 1920s to 1930s, featuring regularly at Wimbledon. He made the mixed doubles quarter-finals of the 1930 Wimbledon Championships with Elsie Pittman. His most famous victory was over Bill Tilden at Cannes in 1930, becoming the first British amateur to defeat the American. He also had a career win over Bunny Austin and once took Jean Borotra to five sets.

Peters, who was involved in his family's brewery business, married tennis player Effie Hemmant in 1932.

References

External links
 

1903 births
1985 deaths
British male tennis players
Alumni of the University of Oxford